The following highways are numbered 346:

Australia
 Avenel-Nagambie Road

Canada
Manitoba Provincial Road 346
 Newfoundland and Labrador Route 346
 Quebec Route 346

Japan
 Japan National Route 346

United States
  Georgia State Route 346 (former)
  Iowa Highway 346
  Kentucky Route 346
  Louisiana Highway 346
  Maryland Route 346
 New York:
  New York State Route 346
  County Route 346 (Erie County, New York)
 County Route 346 (Wayne County, New York)
  Pennsylvania Route 346
  Puerto Rico Highway 346
  South Carolina Highway 346
  Tennessee State Route 346
 Texas:
  Texas State Highway 346 (former)
  Farm to Market Road 346
  Vermont Route 346
  Virginia State Route 346